The Missing Scarf is a 2013 computer animated, dark comedy-related, adventure, Irish short film directed by Eoin Duffy, produced by Jamie Hogan and narrated by George Takei. The film was shortlisted for the 86th Academy Awards. The project was created in conjunction with Irish Film Board, Raidió Teilifís Éireann and Arts Council of Ireland, the short film is made in Blender3D, making the first Blender3D-made short film  to be shortlisted for an Academy Award for Best Animated Short Film in 2014.

Plot
Albert the Squirrel makes a startling discovery ...  an empty space where once his favourite scarf lay. He heads off into the forest only to find everyone else is preoccupied with worries of their own. He helps who he can before moving on but never seems to get any closer to his goal. It is meant to explore life's many fears.

Cast
  George Takei as Narrator

Accolades

References

External links
 
 

2013 films
2013 3D films
2013 animated films
Irish animated short films
2010s animated short films
3D animated short films
2010s English-language films